Angrites are a rare group of achondrites consisting mostly of Al-Ti bearing diopside, hedenbergite, olivine, anorthite and troilite with minor traces of phosphate and metals. The group is named for the Angra dos Reis meteorite. They are the oldest igneous rocks, with crystallization ages of around 4.56 billion years. Angrites are subdivided into two main groups, the quenched and plutonic angrites. The quenched angrites cooled rapidly upon the surface of the angrite parent body (APB), whereas the plutonic angrites cooled slower, deeper in the crust. The APB is thought to have been a similar size to the asteroid 4 Vesta.

Origin
Angrite meteorites are distinct from other meteoritic groups based on their oxygen isotopic compositions. Based on their Mn-Fe ratios in pyroxene and other isotopic compositions, the source of angrites is constrained to the inner Solar System. However, recent studies have suggested that the APB experienced mixing of multiple sources during its history. 

By comparing the reflectance spectra of the angrites to that of several main belt asteroids, two potential parent bodies have been identified: 289 Nenetta and 3819 Robinson. Other scientists have suggested that angrites could represent ejecta from Mercury, however later work has cast significant doubt upon these claims.

Based on the lack of an asteroid matching the spectra of angrite meteorites it is thought that the APB was catastrophically disrupted and subsequently destroyed.

Notable meteorites
There are currently over 30 meteorites classified as angrites. Most of it has been lost over time; the largest remaining piece, weighing 101 grams, is kept at the Museum of Natural History in Rio de Janeiro.

NWA 10463 has been suggested to represent an intermediate stage between the quenched and plutonic angrite meteorites. 

NWA 8535 has been suggested to represent a Dunite. 

Asuka-12209; Asuka-88371 and NWA 12320 demonstrate an oxygen isotopic disequilibrium indicative of planetary mixing.

See also
 Glossary of meteoritics

External links 
D'Orbigny Angrite - Meteorites Australia
Angrite Micro Visions - Thin section pictures of angrites.

References

Asteroidal achondrites